Le Petit Chenail (English: The Little Chenail) connects the west bank of the Yamaska River and the south bank of the Rivière Pot au Beurre, thus forming the Île du Domaine (length:  in a north–south direction;) in the municipality of Yamaska in the Pierre-De Saurel Regional County Municipality (MRC), in the administrative region of Montérégie, on the South Shore of Saint Lawrence River, in Quebec, Canada.

Geography 

The main hydrographic slopes near the "Petit Chenail" are:
 North side: Yamaska River, lake Saint-Pierre;
 East side: Yamaska River;
 South side: Saint-Louis River;
 West side: rivière Pot au Beurre.

The Petit Chenail is mainly fed by the Saint-Louis River (coming from the west). Its course borders the western part of the island of the Domaine.

The northern part of the channel crosses  a marsh area to the lower part of the Rivière Pot au Beurre.

Toponymy 

The toponym "Le Petit Chenail" was officially registered on January 21, 1975, at the Commission de toponymie du Québec.

See also 
 Lac Saint-Pierre, a body of water
 List of rivers of Quebec

References 

Rivers of Montérégie
Pierre-De Saurel Regional County Municipality